Waterhall Mill, also known as Westdene Windmill, is a grade II listed tower mill at Westdene, Sussex, England which has been converted to residential use.

History
Waterhall Mill was built in 1885 by James Holloway, the Shoreham millwright. It was the last windmill built in Sussex, and was working until 1924. In World War II it was used by the Home Guard as a lookout post. The mill was converted into a house in 1963, retaining the machinery and externally restored. New sweeps (Sussex dialect for sails) were erected in 1972 The cap was partly rebuilt and new sweeps erected following a lightning strike in December 1990.

Description

Waterhall Mill is a four-storey brick tower mill with a domed cap winded by a five-bladed fantail. It had four Spring Patent sails carried on a cast iron Windshaft. The iron Brake Wheel is fitted with Holloways screw brake. The mill drove three pairs of underdrift millstones.

Millers
Joseph Harris 1885 - 1903
Bull - 1924

References

Notes

Bibliography

Further reading
 Online version

External links
Windmill World Page on Waterhall  windmill.

Tower mills in the United Kingdom
Grinding mills in the United Kingdom
Windmills completed in 1885
Windmills in Brighton and Hove
Grade II listed buildings in Brighton and Hove